Provincial Route 215 is a  highway in the northeast of the Province of Buenos Aires, Argentina that joins the West Channel in the city of Ensenada and the junction with National Route 3 in San Miguel del Monte.

In the Ensenada Partido, it corresponds to Avenida Horacio Cestino while in the La Plata Partido, it corresponds to Avenida 44. Although the roads are separated to the northeast of the roundabout with the Provincial Route 6, this section does not form a motorway or semi-motorway since the cross streets cross the route level.

History 
National Route 215 was in the original plan of national routes of September 3, 1935, linking the cities of La Plata and San Miguel del Monte.

On April 14, 1937, the company hired by the "Dirección Provincial de Vialidad (Buenos Aires Province Road Directorate", government agency that built and maintained roads in Buenos Aires Province) completed the paving work on a road (3 m wide) from the La Plata to Brandsen section.

On December 14, 1979, a bridge over Provincial route 2 near the Ángel Etcheverry district, was inaugurated. Due to its proximity to the town, it was popularly known as "Cruce Etcheverry" ('Etcheverry Crossing').

In 1982, the Directorate of Roads of the Province of Buenos Aires completed the works to add a divided carriageway with reinforced concrete pavement on this highway in the section between Avenida 131 (border of the city of La Plata) and Provincial Route 6, with variable road width according to the distance to the provincial capital.

The route was later transferred to provincial jurisdiction. In 2007 the construction of the second road of the 18 kilometers that separated Provincial Route 6 from the town of Brandsen was announced. During 2009, a tender was called to carry out the work, which was divided into two stages. This time the first would be held, which would extend between Provincial Route 6 and Los Bosquecitos de Brandsen neighborhood, a section of approximately 11 kilometers.

Major intersections 
{| class="wikitable" style="font-size:%;"
! width= |Partido
! width= |City
! width= |km
! width= |mi
! width= |Exit
! width= |Destinations
! width= |Notes
|-
|-
|rowspan=5| La Plata || rowspan=2| La Plata || 5 || 3.10 ||2||  to Punta Lara (north) – Mar del Sur (south) ||
|-
| 7 ||4.34|| – ||  FCR's La Plata – Policlínico line || 
|-
|-
|-
|-
|-
| 45.6 || 28.33 || – ||  FCR's Constitución – Mar del Plata line || 
|-
|-
|-
Costanera (north) || 
|-

References

Provincial roads in Buenos Aires Province